National road 96 (abbreviated as DK96) is a main road of accelerated traffic (class GP road), belonging to Polish national roads network, with length of  and located in Toruń County (West Pomeranian Voivodeship). It connects motorway A1 (Turzno junction) with national road 15. With its length, the route is the shortest one of all national roads in Poland.
 
It was established by the Ordinance No. 60 of the General Director for National Roads and Motorways of December 20, 2013 that became valid on January 1st, 2014.

The signage of national road 96 is placed only at the exit of Turzno toll plaza on the junction with motorway A1 and near the roundabout with national road 15 – the route number was not placed on the signpost boards.

From 1986 to 2000 the number 96 was assigned to Bielsko-Biała – Kęty – Wadowice – Głogoczów route, which currently is signed as road 52.

Because the route is a direct link to the motorway, vehicles other than motorcars (low-speed vehicles, bicycles, mopeds, horse-drawn, etc.) cannot use it.

Permissible axle load 

Route plan

Notes 
 In the official list of voivodeship roads the village name is erroneously stated as Brzeżno.

References

External links 
 

96